The Lower Rio Negro Mosaic ( is a protected area mosaic in the state of Amazonas, Brazil. It coordinates between eleven conservation units of different types in the Amazon rainforest to the northwest of the state capital, Manaus.

Location

It contains conservation units in the Amazon biome in the state of Amazonas.
The mosaic is part of the Central Amazon Biosphere Reserve and Ecological Corridor.
It covers an area of high biodiversity and high socio-cultural diversity.
It includes igapó, terra firma forest, campina, campinaranas, and caatinga-igapós.

Background

The people of the mosaic include traditional riparian communities, indigenous people, artisan fishers, small farmers and gatherers, as well as people involved in tourism, extraction, business and government. Traditional occupations include slash-and-burn agriculture, plant and animal extraction, logging, hunting, crafts and tourism.
The local residents have the knowledge needed for sustainable development such as ecotourism, non-timber extraction, agriculture, fishing and other practices.

Creation of the Manaus Free Trade Zone in the 1960s generated intensive population movement into the region and economic growth, and also created social, economic and environmental problems that persist today.
Creation of conservation units in the 1980s and 1990s without public consultation caused further conflicts.
Many of the traditional residents began to organize and claim rights to access natural resources and territory.

Creation and objectives

The proposal to create the mosaic was prepared by IPÊ - Instituto de Pesquisas Ecológicas (Institute of Ecological Research) and submitted in January 2005 to the Fundo Nacional do Meio Ambiente – FNMA (National Environment Fund).
Various government agencies, non-governmental organizations and civil society groups participated in developing the plan.
The Waimiri Atroari Indigenous Territory also participated in the process of creating the mosaic, with the possibility of becoming one of its components.
The Lower Rio Negro Mosaic was recognized by ordnance 483 of the Brazilian Ministry of the Environment on 14 December 2010.

The National System of Conservation Units (SNUC) law defines a mosaic as a collection of protected areas of the same or different categories that are near to each other, adjoin each other or overlap, and that should be managed as a whole. 
Given the different categories of conservation unit and other protected areas in a mosaic, including fully protected and sustainable use units, the different conservation goals must be considered.

Conservation units

The Lower Rio Negro Mosaic contains the following conservation units:

Notes

Sources

Environmental protection areas of Brazil
Protected areas of Amazonas (Brazilian state)
2010 establishments in Brazil